Mateo Benjamín Delmastro (born 14 April 2000) is an Argentine badminton player. He won his first senior international title at the 2016 Argentina International in the mixed doubles event partnered with Micaela Suárez at the age of 16. He represented his country at the 2018 Summer Youth Olympics in Buenos Aires, Argentina.

Achievements

BWF International Challenge/Series (1 title, 3 runners-up) 
Men's doubles

Mixed doubles

  BWF International Challenge tournament
  BWF International Series tournament
  BWF Future Series tournament

References

External links 
 

Living people
2000 births
Sportspeople from Bariloche
Argentine male badminton players
Badminton players at the 2018 Summer Youth Olympics
21st-century Argentine people